Gold Run is a stream in the U.S. state of South Dakota.

Gold Run was named for the valuable deposits of gold in the area.

See also
List of rivers of South Dakota

References

Bodies of water of Lawrence County, South Dakota
Rivers of South Dakota